Eszter Mészáros (born 29 June 2002) is a Hungarian sports shooter. She competed in the women's 10 metre air rifle event at the 2020 Summer Olympics.

References

External links
 

2002 births
Living people
Hungarian female sport shooters
Olympic shooters of Hungary
Shooters at the 2020 Summer Olympics
Place of birth missing (living people)
21st-century Hungarian women